Kautzen is a municipality in the district of Waidhofen an der Thaya in the Austrian state of Lower Austria.

Population

Personalities
 Alois Stöger (1904 - 1999, Hainstetten), bishop
 Hans Peter Moravec (born 1948), engineer
 Erwin Hornek (1959), politician

References

External links 

Cities and towns in Waidhofen an der Thaya District